The Potez 230 was a French lightweight single-seat, single-engined fighter aircraft. One prototype was built and flew in 1940, but no production followed, with the prototype being captured and shipped to Germany for study.

Design and development
In 1936, ANF Les Mureaux designed and flew the ANF Les Mureaux 190, a lightweight single-engined fighter aircraft powered by a  ANF Les Mureaux 190 engine and with a fixed undercarriage. The unreliability of the engine caused the 190 to be abandoned in 1937. Despite this setback, and the nationalisation of ANF Les Mureaux to form part of the state-owned SNCAN combine, the former design team of Les Mureaux, René Lemaitre and Hubert led by André Brunet, did not abandon the concept of lightweight fighters, and in 1938, began work on the Potez 230, a more advanced development of the Les Mureaux 190.

Like the earlier aircraft, the Potez 230 was a low-wing cantilever monoplane, with a similar elliptical wing. The wings were built around an integral torsion box, the first example of this structure to have flown, and were fitted with split trailing-edge flaps. The aircraft's fuselage was of oval cross-section, with the pilot accommodated in an enclosed cockpit. The aircraft was powered by a  Hispano-Suiza 12Xcrs V12 engine driving a three-bladed Ratier propeller in a tractor configuration. Armament was planned to be a single Hispano-Suiza 20 mm cannon mounted between the engine cylinder banks and firing through the propeller, with four 7.5 mm machine guns to be mounted in the wings.

The unarmed prototype made its maiden flight at Villacoublay on 30 March 1940. The German invasion of France disrupted testing, however, with the prototype captured by the Germans when they seized Villacoublay airfield in June 1940. The Germans were interested in the novel wing torsion box, and the prototype, together with all available drawings and data, was shipped to Germany for closer study.

Specifications

See also

Notes

References

External links

 Aviafrance

World War II French fighter aircraft
1940s French fighter aircraft
071